On Fire may refer to:

Film and television 
 On Fire, a 1996 Hong Kong film directed by Clarence Fok
 "On Fire" (Law & Order: Criminal Intent), a television episode

Literature
 On Fire (book), a 2019 non-fiction book by Naomi Klein
 On Fire: A Teen Wolf Novel, a 2012 novel by Nancy Holder
 On Fire, a 1993 memoir by Larry Brown

Albums 
 On Fire (The Cottars album), 2004
 On Fire (Galaxie 500 album), 1989
 On Fire (The Higher album), 2007
 On Fire (The Lights Out album) or the title song, 2012
 On Fire (Mastercastle album), 2013
 On Fire (Michel Camilo album) or the title song, 1989
 On Fire (Peter Furler album), 2011
 On Fire (Spiritual Beggars album), 2002
 On Fire (Stetsasonic album) or the title song, 1986
 On Fire (T-Connection album) or the title song, 1978
 On Fire!, by Petra, 1988
 On Fire (EP), by Alec Empire, 2007
 On Fire, by the Kaʻau Crater Boys, 1995
 On Fyre, by Lyres, 1984

Songs 
 "On Fire" (Blue Zone song), 1987
 "On Fire" (Lil Wayne song), 2009
 "On Fire" (Lloyd Banks song), 2004
 "On Fire" (Loïc Nottet song), 2018
 "On Fire" (The Roop song), 2020
 "On Fire" (Stefanie Heinzmann song), 2015
 "On Fire", by Eminem from Recovery, 2010
 "On Fire", by Franka Batelić, 2011
 "On Fire", by Garbage from No Gods No Masters, 2021
 "On Fire", by Lightning Bolt from Wonderful Rainbow, 2003
 "On Fire", by Luke Bond featuring Roxanne Emery, 2014
 "On Fire", by Modjo from Modjo, 2001
 "On Fire", by Redman from Muddy Waters, 1996
 "On Fire", by Sebadoh from Harmacy, 1996
 "On Fire", by Spiritualized from Let It Come Down, 2001
 "On Fire", by Switchfoot from The Beautiful Letdown, 2003
 "On Fire", by Tone Lōc from Lōc-ed After Dark, 1989
 "On Fire", by Van Halen from Van Halen, 1978
 "On Fire", by Young Thug from Beautiful Thugger Girls, 2017

Other uses
 "On Fire", a 2013 strip of the webcomic Gunshow, origin of the "This is fine" internet meme

See also 
 Fire
 On the Fire, a 1919 American short comedy film featuring Harold Lloyd